The U.S. state of Maine has several official symbols.

State symbols
 State Animal: Moose
 State Ballad: "The Ballad of the 20th Maine" by The Ghost of Paul Revere
 State Berry: Blueberry
 State Beverage: Moxie
 State Bird: Chickadee (Boreal Chickadee & Black-capped Chickadee)
 State Cat: Maine Coon Cat
 State Crustacean: Lobster
 State Dessert: Blueberry pie
 State Fish: Landlocked salmon
 State Flag: Flag of Maine
 State Flower: White Pine Cone and Tassel
 State Fossil: Pertica quadrifaria
 State Gemstone: Tourmaline
 State Herb: Wintergreen
 State Insect: Honey bee
 State Motto: Dirigo (I Lead)
 State Nickname: The Pine Tree State
 State Seal: Seal of Maine
 State Soil: Chesuncook (soil)
 State Song: "State of Maine Song" by Roger Vinton Snow
 State Treat: Whoopie pie
 State Tree: Eastern White Pine
 State Vessel: Bowdoin

References

Maine
Maine culture
Symbols